Jack Melville Francis McGarity (16 January 1897 – 16 March 1974) was an Australian rules footballer who played with Essendon in the Victorian Football League (VFL).

McGarity was born Jack Melville Francis to the unmarried Ellen Francis in Carlton Women's Hospital in 1897. In 1898 Ellen married William McGarity, and Jack assumed the surname of his stepfather.

Notes

External links 
		

1897 births
1974 deaths
Australian rules footballers from Victoria (Australia)
Essendon Football Club players